Jigglypuff, known in Japan as , is a Pokémon species.  Jigglypuff first appeared in the video games Pokémon Red and Blue and subsequent sequels, later appearing in various merchandise, spinoff titles and animated and printed adaptations of the franchise. Jigglypuff is voiced by Rachael Lillis in English and by Mika Kanai in Japanese. In the live-action musical Pokémon Live!, Jigglypuff is portrayed by Leah Smith. Jigglypuff is also very well known for singing a lullaby in the Pokémon anime series.

Known as the Balloon Pokémon, Jigglypuff evolves from Igglybuff when it reaches a certain point of happiness, and evolves into Wigglytuff when exposed to a Moon Stone. Its English name is a combination of the words "jiggly" and "puff", intended to relate to its jelly-like appearance. The character has been featured in a recurring role in the anime series and served as the focus for several printed adaptions of the franchise. Since it appeared in the Pokémon series, Jigglypuff has received generally positive reception. It has been featured in several forms of merchandise, including figurines, plush toys, and the Pokémon Trading Card Game. It also has appeared as a playable character in every entry of the Super Smash Bros. series.

Design and characteristics
Jigglypuff was one of 151 different Generation I Pokémon designs conceived by Game Freak's character development team and finalized by Ken Sugimori, for the first-generation of Pocket Monsters games Red and Green, which were localized outside Japan as Pokémon Red and Blue. Its Japanese name "Purin", derives from the Japanese loanword for custard or pudding. Nintendo decided to give the various Pokémon species "clever and descriptive names" related to their appearance or features when translating the game for western audiences as a means to make the characters more relatable to American children. Deciding to use a name better suited for its jelly-like appearance, the species was renamed "Jigglypuff", a combination of the words "jiggly" and "puff". When a Jigglypuff is exposed to a Moon Stone, it evolves into Wigglytuff. It has a pre-evolution, Igglybuff, which evolves when it reaches a certain point of happiness.

Known as the Balloon Pokémon, Jigglypuff is shaped like a round ball with pink skin, large blue or green eyes, pointy ears, and a tuft of fur on its forehead. It can inflate its body like a balloon (usually when it becomes angry; this is accompanied by a distinctive "honk" sound), or flatten its body, much like fellow Nintendo character Kirby. An exact limit to the size it can grow to in this manner is unknown. Jigglypuff are characterized by putting their enemies to sleep by singing a lullaby. Before beginning to sing, they mesmerize the opponent with their soft, glowing eyes and, if they inflate themselves, they can sing for longer periods of time. They can easily adjust the wavelength of their voices to that of the brain waves of a sleeping being, allowing for their pleasing melody to put its audience to sleep. They sing without pausing to take a breath, so if the opponent is resistant to sleeping, they potentially run out of air. Game Freak's staff have noted Jigglypuff as both one of their and the public's favorite Pokémon, in terms of both anime and video game appearances.

Appearances

In video games

Jigglypuff first appears as one of the 151 species of Pokémon in the Pokémon Red and Blue Versions. When a Jigglypuff is exposed to a Moon Stone, it evolves into Wigglytuff. In Pokémon Gold and Silver, a pre-evolution, Igglybuff, was introduced, which evolves when it reaches a certain point of happiness. It later appeared in several sequels, including Pokémon Ruby and Sapphire, Pokémon FireRed and LeafGreen, Pokémon Diamond and Pearl, and Pokémon HeartGold and SoulSilver. Since Pokémon X and Y, it is a dual Normal/Fairy type. A Paradox Pokemon heavily resembling Jigglypuff, named Scream Tail, appears in Pokémon Scarlet and Violet.

Outside of the main series, Jigglypuff has appeared in Pokémon Pinball, Pokémon Snap, Pokémon Conquest, the Pokémon Mystery Dungeon games, the Pokémon Ranger games, and the Pokémon Rumble games. Jigglypuff is a playable character in all five Super Smash Bros. games. It is one of the two original representatives of the Pokémon franchise in the Super Smash Bros. series along with Pikachu. Like the other playable Pokémon in the game, Jigglypuff is referred to as an "it", and members of its species can be either male or female. Despite not being a lead character in the Pokémon franchise, game director Masahiro Sakurai selected it to appear due to its similarities to Kirby, which allowed the staff to reuse the model and many animations as a base for Jigglypuff. Jigglypuff's moves in its Super Smash Bros. appearances are Sing, Rollout, Pound, and Rest. Rest's mechanics are changed entirely; instead of recovering Jigglypuff's health, the move launches foes that touch it.

In anime
In the Pokémon anime series, Jigglypuff is a recurring character who aspires to be a great singer after the inspiration of Ash and company. Unfortunately, most potential audiences fall asleep before the song finishes. Jigglypuff's singing can often prove problematic to the series' protagonists, as it causes all around to fall asleep. It carries around a trademark marker, which it uses as a microphone due to its resemblance to such when it is capped.  When it realizes those who have been subject to its song have fallen asleep, it angrily uses the marker to draw on their faces.

During Jigglypuff's first appearance ("The Song of Jigglypuff"), it was found standing on a stump. Misty tried to capture it with the help of her Staryu, but felt bad when the Jigglypuff started crying. They soon realised that Jigglypuff was upset because it could not sing, and after a series of failed vocal exercises, Brock gave it a piece of fruit which soothed its throat. Now capable of singing, it performed for them, putting everyone within hearing range to sleep. This upset Jigglypuff, which angrily dug into Ash's backpack and pulled out a marker which it used to draw on the faces of everyone who fell asleep. Only on two occasions has Jigglypuff believed that anyone had heard its song to the end: in the first, Jigglypuff realizes that Misty's Psyduck was sleeping with its eyes open, and in the second ("A Poké-Block Party"), a Whismur had heard the song for the first time and stayed awake due to its Soundproof ability, but on the second time it was tired and fell asleep. In "Beach Blank-Out Blastoise" Jigglypuff somehow got stuck inside one of Blastoise's hydro cannons but was later freed by Squirtle and Pikachu. In "The Ancient Puzzle of Pokémopolis", Jigglypuff sang to two gigantic Pokémon battling each other, but these two Pokémon did not fall asleep, and instead, Jigglypuff was knocked away by the energy of their battle. In the Pokémon short Pikachu's Exploration Club, Jigglypuff is parodied by a Marill, which, in the same fashion, puffs up angrily after putting its audience into sleep with its song. In Pokémon Chronicles, Marina has a Jigglypuff, but when the Jigglypuff uses Sing, people are not affected in part because of Beedrill, whose beating wings are too loud.

In 2006, Viz released ten DVDs based around individual Pokémon in celebration of Pokémon'''s 10th anniversary in the United States. The Pokémon featured were determined by an online poll on pokemon.com. Out of 45 choices, Jigglypuff's received second place and was released as volume 2, with Pikachu's being the first volume. Another compilation of Pokémon anime episodes, including "The Song of Jigglypuff" in which Jigglypuff is introduced, is available on both VHS and DVD, entitled "Jigglypuff Pop", which was released by Viz Video (now Viz Media) and 4Kids Entertainment. Jigglypuff's last appearance was in Pokémon the Series: Ruby and Sapphires Advanced Generation after over a decade, and disappeared after.

Another Jigglypuff appears in Pokémon the Movie: I Choose You!, but as a minor character Pokémon under its ownership of an unnamed girl Trainer, in which it has lost its battle against Ash's Charmander that has become middle-evolved Charmeleon, and then now fully-evolved Charizard during his battle against Cross's Incineroar.

In printed adaptations
In the Electric Tale of Pikachu manga, a girl named Mimi owns a Jigglypuff, who helps defend a herd of wild Clefairy from Jessie and James of Team Rocket. The Magical Pokémon Journey manga series has a female Jigglypuff as one of the main characters, parodying Hello Kitty, and is introduced to the series in a volume called Cooking With Jigglypuff. The Jigglypuff in Magical Pokémon Journey is spoiled and rich, living in a mansion with Wigglytuff and Squirtle, the former being her sister and the latter her butler. Jigglypuff's Magic Lullaby is part of the Pokémon Tales series for very young children. Written by Megumi Hayashibara and illustrated by Kagemaru Himeno, it tells the story of a Jigglypuff who wants to make the other Pokémon happy by singing for them. Yet, as usual, her song puts them to sleep, and this makes her very sad until her friend helps her resolve the situation.

In the Pokémon Adventures manga, one of the main characters, Green, has a Jigglypuff which is capable of swelling up to several times its size. This allows Green to float with it like a hot-air balloon as well as block narrow passageways—a tactic instrumental in helping Silver and her escape the Masked Man. It evolved in Breaking the Restraint into a Wigglytuff alongside two of Green's other Pokémon with the power of her Moon Stones.

In other media
Jigglypuff makes a cameo appearance in a season six episode of Last Week Tonight with John Oliver, in which the host accidentally kills one while playing Pokemon GO. Jigglypuff is one of the Pokémon that appear in the Pokémon: Detective Pikachu film, voiced using archived recordings of Rachael Lillis from the anime. The character briefly appears at a coffee bar having accidentally put its trainer to sleep with its song.

Promotion and reception

Jigglypuff has proven to be a popular character since its introduction. Described as "perhaps the most ridiculously named Pokémon" of the original 151 by The Virginian-Pilot, Jigglypuff has been noted as one of the series' most popular characters and one of Nintendo's mascots. The book Pikachu's Global Adventure: The Rise and Fall of Pokémon' described Jigglypuff as popular with a young, female audience across the franchise as a whole, attributing said popularity to both the immediate attraction of children to its pink color and its contrast to Pokémon species more popular with young males, such as Squirtle or Charmander. The journal Sex Roles noted that while Jigglypuff's gender in the anime was never explicitly stated, it was identified by a majority of people as a female character in the series. Additionally, it was the most often named female Pokémon by children when asked to recall one, which the study attributed to its pink color and ability to sing its opponents to sleep. The Australian Journal of Language and Literacy cited Jigglypuff as a tool to use for introducing children to drama, citing its mannerisms in the anime. Andrew Tei of Mania.com complained that Jigglypuff's portrayal in the anime quickly becomes irritating. Carolyn Gudmundson of GamesRadar disagreed, calling Jigglypuff's anime appearances "totally badass" while also criticizing its unoriginal, overused design. David Caballero of Screen Rant listed Jigglypuff as the cutest normal type Pokémon, and stated that it is one of the franchise's most recognizable and popular Pokémon that has been around since the early days of Generation I. GamesRadar editor Carolyn Gudmundson listed the "huggable pink blob" type Pokémon as one of the most overused Pokémon designs, stating that it had a memorable run on the anime. Author Harry Schlesinger wrote that Jigglypuff was popular among girls. James Whitbrook of Gizmodo stated that Jigglypuff is the most iconic creatures. Caitlin Griffin of Screen Rant listed Jigglypuff as a cutest fairy-type Pokémon, and stated that it is one of the most recognizable fairy Pokemon. Daniel Kurland of Comic Book Resources listed Jigglypuff as the most adorable normal type Pokémon, and stated that Jigglypuff is the cutest of its evolutionary line. Kevin Slackie of Paste listed Jigglypuff as 19th of the best Pokemon. Steven Bogos of The Escapist listed Jigglypuff as 32nd of their favorite Pokemon, describing it as one of those iconic Pokemon that has quite a bit of sticking power. International Business Times cited Jigglypuff as an example of best Pokémon design in Generation I.

Jigglypuff's floaty and campy playstyle in the Super Smash Bros. series has led to some controversy. During a 2019 tournament of Super Smash Bros. Melee, a player decided to quit due to an opponent who played Jigglypuff repeatedly stalling. Largely credited with elevating the Melee community's perception of Jigglypuff's viability in competition and setting the standard of how to play the character, a notable professional Super Smash Bros. player Hungrybox relies heavily on a defensive, counterattack-centric playstyle revolving around avoiding his opponent until he finds an opportunity to attack and capitalize on their mistakes; it is considered a "high risk high reward" playstyle, as Hungrybox's usual goal is to eventually hit his opponent with Rest, a move unique to Jigglypuff which inflicts instant high knockback on opponents. The move has a very small range, making it hard to connect, and, regardless of whether or not it successfully hits, leaves Jigglypuff asleep and completely vulnerable for a long time afterwards; as such, failure to connect with Rest, failure to knock the opponent back far enough and to kill them, or failure to wake up in time after killing an opponent can result in massive damage inflicted on Jigglypuff, or, if Jigglypuff’s damage is already high, an instant kill. In response to the controversy, the tournament Super Smash Con made some rules against “ledge-camping”, as the character is so effective with the tactic that the some people considered that it was breaking the game and making the game not fun to watch.

IGN editor Lucas Thompson described Jigglypuff as a popular punching bag in the Super Smash Bros. series, but also said that it has dedicated players who make good use of it in battle. Jeremy Parish of Polygon ranked 73 fighters from Super Smash Bros. Ultimate "from garbage to glorious", listing Jigglypuff as 42nd. Scott Baird of Screen Rant considered Jigglypuff’s competitive viability in Super Smash Bros. for Nintendo 3DS and Wii U to be worthless, and stated that due to it being the lightest character in the game, it can easily be killed. Gavin Jasper of Den of Geek ranked Jigglypuff as 14th of Super Smash Bros. Ultimate characters, and calling it “one of better Pokémon”, due to both its cute appearance, and deadly moves.

Jigglypuff is often featured on products where a scene of several Pokémon are shown. An example of this is the full-sized Pokémon 747 aircraft by Boeing. Jigglypuff appeared on the starboard nose of the original white 1998 aircraft and above the starboard wing of the 1999 blue aircraft.  Jigglypuff was also on the nose of the international version of the plane. Solaseed Air also has Pokémon theme such as Jigglypuff. Jigglypuff has been made into several different toy and plush forms, as well as other items. These include a four-inch action figure by Tomy Toys, a small beanbag plush toy by Hasbro, a Halloween costume by Disguise Costumes, a six-inch plush "Christmas Jigglypuff", and an articulated action figure also by Hasbro. In 2015, an Amiibo of Jigglypuff has been made by Toys 'R Us. A Jigglypuff Bluetooth speaker was made by GameStop’s ThinkGeek brand, and has been published by the Federal Communications Commission. A variety merchandise of Jigglypuff has been also made such as clothing, sweatshirts and hoodies, hooded scarp, plush, build a bear workshops, fashion boots, wireless earbuds, controller, necklaces, kids shoe line, and jewelry collection has been also made.

In 2016, after the popularity of Pokémon Go, according to BabyCenter, parents have been naming their babies as Pokémon creatures such as Jigglypuff. 2018, Jigglypuff singing habits become an Internet meme. Twitter account @jigglysinging has been made to overlay hit songs for a clip of Jigglypuff performance. In 2019, Westboro Baptist Church recruits Jigglypuff against LGBT community on Pokémon Go''.

References

External links

 Bulbapedia article about Jigglypuff
 Jigglypuff on Pokemon.com

Fictional fairies and sprites
Pokémon species
Singer characters in video games
Super Smash Bros. fighters
Nintendo protagonists
Video game characters introduced in 1996
Video game mascots
Fictional characters who can manipulate light
Video game memes
Fictional characters who can stretch themselves
Fictional characters who can change size

ca:Línia evolutiva d'Igglybuff#Jigglypuff
cs:Seznam pokémonů (21-40)#Jigglypuff
es:Anexo:Pokémon de la primera generación#Jigglypuff
fr:Toudoudou et ses évolutions#Rondoudou
pl:Lista Pokémonów (21-40)#Jigglypuff
fi:Luettelo Pokémon-lajeista (21–40)#Jigglypuff